Michal Tsur is an Israeli entrepreneur. She is the founder, president, and general manager of Kaltura.

Biography

Early life and education 
Tsur was born in Jerusalem. She completed a PhD in Law, focusing on game theoretic economic analysis of law from New York University. Moreover, she was a post-doctoral fellow at Yale Law School's Information Society Project.

Career 
Tsur launched her career in the law sector as a clerk at the Supreme Court of Israel. She was driven by research, working at Hebrew University in Jerusalem and the Israeli Democracy Institute.

In 1999, Tsur launched Cyota, a cybersecurity company acquired by RSA Security in 2005.

Attracted by the tech field, Tsur and a few friends decided to venture into the tech industry. In 2006, Tsur launched Kaltura, an open source video platform.

Tsur has authored and contributed to many articles regarding women in tech.

References

External links 
 

Living people
Israeli company founders
People from Jerusalem
Year of birth missing (living people)
New York University School of Law alumni